Elliott D. Kieff (born 1943) is the Harriett Ryan Albee Professor of Microbiology and Immunobiology at Harvard Medical School and Brigham and Women’s Hospital. He had previously served as Chair of the Virology Program at Harvard Medical School from 1991 to 2004.

Education 
Kieff attended Central High School prior to receiving a BS in Chemistry cum laude from the University of Pennsylvania in 1964.  At Penn, Kieff worked on the structure of Tetrahydrofuran with Professor Fred Brutcher in the Department of Organic Chemistry.
 
In 1968, Kieff received an M.D. from Johns Hopkins University.  While at Hopkins, Kieff worked with Robert Langdon on the effects of diabetes on mitochondrial biochemistry.  He also worked with Daniel Nathans on MS2 bacteriophage.  During his clinical training in Internal Medicine at Hopkins, Kieff began to work in the Department of Microbiology with Bernard Roizman.

In 1969, Kieff followed Bernard Roizman to the University of Chicago.  In 1971, Kieff received a PhD from the University of Chicago for studies on the size, structure, and relatedness among Herpes Viruses DNAs.

Following the completion of his graduate studies, Kieff was appointed to an Assistant Professorship in Microbiology and Medicine at the University of Chicago.

In 1975, Kieff was promoted from assistant professor to associate professor.  Subsequently, in 1985, Kieff was appointed to the Louis Block Professorship in Microbiology and Molecular Genetics at the University of Chicago.

In 1986, Kieff joined the faculty of Harvard Medical School.  In 1988, he was appointed to the Harriet Ryan Albee Professorship of Microbiology and Immunobiology at Harvard Medical School and the Brigham and Women’s Hospital.

Research 
In 1971, Kieff established an independent research laboratory at the University of Chicago. He focused his research on the newly discovered Epstein-Barr Virus (EBV) and characterized EBV DNA, RNAs, and virus encoded proteins, including annotation of their roles in infection and oncogenesis. He first purified intact EBV genome DNA, characterized the genome size, base composition, similarities and differences among EBV genomes from people with Burkitt’s Lymphoma and Infectious Mononucleosis.  Kieff developed annotated restriction enzyme maps of EBV genomes from humans and non-human primates, and characterized the principal EBV transcripts in latently infected cells.

In 1986, Kieff moved to Harvard Medical School and the Brigham and Women’s Hospital, where he was appointed to the Harriett Ryan Albee Professorship. He established the utility of second site homologous recombination for genetic analyses that identified the essential EBV genes for growth transformation. His laboratory also identified the roles of EBV Nuclear antigens (EBNAs) and Latent Infection Membrane Proteins (LMPs) in EBV mediated cell growth transformation.  Kieff found LMP1 to be the principal EBV oncogene that uses transcription nuclear factors (TNF) receptor-associated factors to activate NF-κB and promote EBV infected cell growth and survival.

In the 1990s, Kieff’s laboratory identified the major signaling components that mediate LMP1 NF-κB activation and characterized the functions of the EBV nuclear antigen proteins.  Kieff identified the role of EBNA2 in activation of cell oncogenes; discovered the key functions of EBNALP, EBNA3A and EBNA3C in B-cell growth transformation and in regulation of cell gene expression; characterized the EBV receptor, CD21, which mediates EBV attachment and entry into B cells; demonstrated the role of the EBV glycoprotein, gp350, in B-cell infection, and demonstrated that gp350 antibodies can be used as a vaccine to block EBV infection.  More recently, Kieff’s lab extensively used genome-wide approaches to further characterize the global role of EBV infection in B-cell transformation.  This discovery identified the first virus super-enhancers, which establish EBV transformed cell proliferation.

Kieff has published more than 300 peer-reviewed journal articles and twenty-seven books/textbooks for the medical and scientific community.

His research has been supported by the NIH National Cancer Institute, the American Cancer Society, and the National Institute of Allergy and Infectious Disease.

Clinical 
The emergence of the HIV pandemic in the 1980s created the need for basic and clinical HIV care and treatment. Bernard Fields, Chair of Microbiology at Harvard, Eugene Braunwald, Chair of Medicine at the BWH, and Dean Daniel Charles Tosteson, recruited Kieff to build an Infectious Disease Division at the Brigham and Women’s Hospital.  
In 1989, Kieff became Chief of Infectious Disease at Harvard Medical School and the Brigham and Women’s Hospital; a position he served for 25 years until his recruitment of Daniel Kuritzkes to undertake leadership of the Clinical Infectious Disease Division.

Awards and honors 
- 1976—elected to the American Society for Clinical Investigation.

- 1988—elected to the Interurban Club,

- 1985—elected to the Association of American Physicians (AAP)

- 1991—Karl Meyer Visiting Professor at UCSF.

- 1987 & 1994—received Outstanding Investigator Awards from the NIH NCI.

- 1996—elected to the National Academy of Sciences.

- 1996—received an Alumni AOA award from Johns Hopkins.

- 2001—elected to the Institute of Medicine and the American Academy of Arts and Sciences.

- 2006—Lamb Visiting Professor at Vanderbilt University.

- 2008—elected Vice President of the AAP

- 2009—elected President of the AAP

- 2011—received a Distinguished Alumnus Award from the University of Chicago.

- 2011 and 2014—gave the Howard Taylor Ricketts Memorial Lecture at the University of Chicago.

Personal life 
Kieff is married to Jacqueline for more than 50 years. Elliott and Jacqueline have three children and five grandchildren.

To help graduating Central High School students in their matriculation to outstanding colleges, the Kieff family endowed a Central High School Science prize, with the expectation that such Prizes would facilitate college entry at a time when admission to a prestigious college has become challenging.

Notable publications 

1: Raab-Traub N, Dambaugh T, Kieff E. DNA of Epstein-Barr virus VIII: B95-8, the previous prototype, is an unusual deletion derivative. Cell. 1980 Nov;22:257-67.

2: Dambaugh T, Nkrumah FK, Biggar RJ, Kieff E. Epstein-Barr virus RNA in Burkitt tumor tissue. Cell. 1979 Feb;16(2):313-22.

3: Matsuo T, Heller M, Petti L, O'Shiro E, Kieff E. Persistence of the entire Epstein-Barr virus genome integrated into human lymphocyte DNA. Science. 1984 Dec14;226(4680):1322-5.

4: Hennessy K, Heller M, van Santen V, Kieff E. Simple repeat array in Epstein-Barr virus DNA encodes part of the Epstein-Barr nuclear antigen. Science. 1983 Jun 24;220(4604):1396-8.

5: Wang D, Liebowitz D, Kieff E. An EBV membrane protein expressed in immortalized lymphocytes transforms established rodent cells. Cell. 1985 Dec; 43:831-40.

6: Hennessy K, Kieff E. A second nuclear protein is encoded by Epstein-Barr virus in latent infection. Science. 1985 Mar 8;227(4691):1238-40.

7: Tanner J, Weis J, Fearon D, Whang Y, Kieff E. Epstein-Barr virus gp350/220 binding to the B lymphocyte C3d receptor mediates adsorption, capping, and endocytosis. Cell. 1987 Jul 17;50(2):203-13.

8: Henderson S, Rowe M, Gregory C, Croom-Carter D, Wang F, Longnecker R, Kieff E, Rickinson A. Induction of bcl-2 expression by Epstein-Barr virus latent membrane  protein 1 protects infected B cells from programmed cell death. Cell. 1991 Jun 28; 65(7):1107-15.

9: Mosialos G, Birkenbach M, Yalamanchili R, VanArsdale T, Ware C, Kieff E. The Epstein-Barr virus transforming protein LMP1 engages signaling proteins for the tumor necrosis factor receptor family. Cell. 1995 Feb 10;80(3):389-99.

10: Miller CL, Burkhardt AL, Lee JH, Stealey B, Longnecker R, Bolen JB, Kieff E. Integral membrane protein 2 of Epstein-Barr virus regulates reactivation from latency through dominant negative effects on protein-tyrosine kinases. Immunity. 1995 Feb;2(2):155-66.

11: Mannick JB, Asano K, Izumi K, Kieff E, Stamler JS. Nitric oxide produced by human B lymphocytes inhibits apoptosis and Epstein-Barr virus reactivation. Cell. 1994 Dec 30;79(7):1137-46.

12: Zhou H, Schmidt SC, Jiang S, Willox B, Bernhardt K, Liang J, Johannsen EC, Kharchenko P, Gewurz BE, Kieff E, Zhao B. Epstein-Barr virus oncoprotein super-enhancers control B cell growth. Cell Host Microbe. 2015 Feb 11;17(2):205-16.

References 

University of Chicago faculty
University of Chicago alumni
University of Pennsylvania alumni
Johns Hopkins School of Medicine alumni
Harvard Medical School faculty
1943 births
Living people
Members of the United States National Academy of Sciences
Members of the National Academy of Medicine